The Electronic Vaccination Data System or EVDS is the South African Self vaccination portal. Registration is currently available for everyone over the age of 18, with registration to open for those aged 12 to 18 to open on the 20th of October 2021.

Vaccine cards

Physical 
Current South African Covid-19 Vaccination Record Cards Contain Identification information and provision for 3 doses of vaccines.

eVaccine Card 

The eVaccine Card or Digital Vaccine Certificates can be accessed at https://vaccine.certificate.health.gov.za/

The Digital Certificate has the Department of Health Logo at the top with a QR Code on the right intended to be used in the future, said to be available by the end of 2021.

There 3 sections to the Certificate.

The first section contains identification data including ID Document Used, ID Number, First Name, Surname and Date Of Birth.

The second section contains vaccine dose information as in Vaccine Received, Vaccine Date and Proof of vaccination code. This will be on there twice if the individual has received more than one dose.

The final section contains a card expiration date.

See also 
 COVID-19 vaccination in South Africa

References 

 
Government services portals